Paul Pietsch (20 June 1911 – 31 May 2012) was a racing driver, journalist and publisher from Germany, who founded the magazine Das Auto. He was the first German ever to take part in a Formula One Grand Prix.

Biography
Born in Freiburg, Pietsch began his racing career in 1932 with a private Bugatti and Alfa Romeo.

Racing with an Alfa Romeo, he won the 1933 III Svenska Isloppet GP ice race in Hemfjärden, and the 1934 I Vallentunaloppet ice race in Vellentunasjön, both in Sweden.

In the 1935 German Grand Prix he raced for Auto Union, and he finished third in the 1935 Italian Grand Prix before leaving the team with its hard-to-drive rear engines. From 1937 onwards he entered a private Maserati. His greatest hours came in the 1939 German Grand Prix which he led from lap two until the ignition failed, making him drop down to third, which was still an excellent result for a privateer against the dominant force of the Silver Arrows.

After the war, he participated in three World Championship Grands Prix, debuting on September 3, 1950. His drive in a factory Alfa Romeo in the 1951 German Grand Prix ended with an accident. He scored no championship points.

At that time, Pietsch was already a successful editor and publisher of motorcycle and automobile magazines.  His company, Motor Presse Stuttgart, is the largest in the European market for technology and special interest magazines.

From the death of his countryman Karl Kling in 2003 until his own death, Pietsch was the oldest surviving Formula One driver, at age 100 and the last surviving driver of pre-war grand prix era. His son Peter-Paul Pietsch races often at the Nürburgring with fellow journalists.

On 31 May 2012, Pietsch died from pneumonia at the age of 100 years, 11 months and 11 days. Pietsch was also the first Grand Prix driver to reach the age of 100.

Racing record

Complete European Championship results
(key) (Races in bold indicate pole position) (Races in italics indicate fastest lap)

Notes
 – As a co-driver Pietsch was ineligible for championship points

Complete Formula One World Championship results
(key)

See also
 List of centenarians (sportspeople)

References

1911 births
2012 deaths
German Formula One drivers
Alfa Romeo Formula One drivers
German racing drivers
Grand Prix drivers
Sportspeople from Freiburg im Breisgau
German centenarians
Men centenarians
Racing drivers from Baden-Württemberg
European Championship drivers